Billy Boyo (born Billy Theophilus Rowe, 21 September 1969 – 29 October 2000) was a Jamaican reggae artist born in Kingston, Jamaica, who was arguably the most prolific of the early-1980s child DJs. He is most well known for his songs "One Spliff a Day" and "Billy Boyo In The Area".

Biography
Billy Boyo was still in his teens when he emerged in the early 1980s. In 1983, he (together with Little John and Ranking Toyan) went to London where he linked up with producer Silver Kamel.

Along with the above noted "One Spliff a Day," Billy also charted in 1982 with the Henry Junjo Lawes produced single, "Wicked She Wicked."  This hit had the added charm of a 13-year-old child's voice on the microphone chanting about a wicked girl.

Billy Boyo was not a prolific recording artist as he did not record much before, or after, the tracks for the first two albums, and was maybe more known as a live MC. His musical career was short-lived and little was heard of him since the second half of the 1980s. Billy Boyo died of a brain tumour on 29 October 2000, after a two-month-long struggle.

Discography 
 The Very Best of Me, 1980-82.
 Zim Zim, 1983.
 DJ Clash vol 2, Little Harry & Billy Boyo. 1983.

Compilations
 D.J. Clash, Little Harry & Billy Boyo & Nicodemus. 1983.

External links 
Billy Boyo at Roots Archive
Billy Boyo on Youtube.com
Myspace page with songs and videoclips of Boyo

1969 births
2000 deaths
Musicians from Kingston, Jamaica
Jamaican reggae musicians